Anosmia, also known as smell blindness, is the loss of the ability to detect one or more smells. Anosmia may be temporary or permanent. It differs from hyposmia, which is a decreased sensitivity to some or all smells.

Anosmia can be due to a number of factors, including an inflammation of the nasal mucosa, blockage of nasal passages or a destruction of one temporal lobe. Inflammation is due to chronic mucosa changes in the lining of the paranasal sinus and in the middle and superior turbinates.

When anosmia is caused by inflammatory changes in the nasal passageways, it is treated simply by reducing inflammation. It can be caused by chronic meningitis and neurosyphilis that would increase intracranial pressure over a long period of time, and in some cases by ciliopathy, including ciliopathy due to primary ciliary dyskinesia.

The term derives from the New Latin anosmia, based on Ancient Greek ἀν- (an-) + ὀσμή (osmḗ 'smell'; another related term, hyperosmia, refers to an increased ability to smell). Some people may be anosmic for one particular odor, a condition known as "specific anosmia". The absence of the sense of smell from birth is known as congenital anosmia.

In the United States, 3% of people aged over 40 are affected by anosmia.

Anosmia is a common symptom of COVID-19 and can persist as long COVID.

Definition
Anosmia is the inability to smell. It may be partial or total, and can be specific to certain smells. Reduced sensitivity to some or all smells is hyposmia.

Signs and symptoms
Anosmia can have a number of harmful effects. People with sudden onset anosmia may find food less appetizing, though congenital anosmics rarely complain about this, and none report a loss in weight. Loss of smell can also be dangerous because it hinders the detection of gas leaks, fire, and spoiled food. The common view of anosmia as trivial can make it more difficult for a patient to receive the same types of medical aid as someone who has lost other senses, such as hearing or sight.

Many experience one sided loss of smell, often as a result of minor head trauma. This type of anosmia is normally only detected if both of the nostrils are tested separately. Using this method of testing each nostril separately will often show a reduced or even completely absent sense of smell in either one nostril or both, something which is often not revealed if both nostrils are simultaneously tested.

Losing an established and sentimental smell memory (e.g. the smell of grass, of the grandparents' attic, of a particular book, of loved ones, or of oneself) has been known to cause feelings of depression.

Loss of the ability to smell may lead to the loss of libido, though this usually does not apply to loss of smell present at birth.

Often people who have loss of smell at birth report that they pretended to be able to smell as children because they thought that smelling was something that older/mature people could do, or did not understand the concept of smelling but did not want to appear different from others. When children get older, they often realize and report to their parents that they do not actually possess a sense of smell, often to the surprise of their parents.

Causes
A temporary loss of smell can be caused by a blocked nose or infection. In contrast, a permanent loss of smell may be caused by death of olfactory receptor neurons in the nose or by brain injury in which there is damage to the olfactory nerve or damage to brain areas that process smell (see olfactory system). The lack of the sense of smell at birth, usually due to genetic factors, is referred to as congenital anosmia. Family members of the patient with congenital anosmia are often found with similar histories; this suggests that the anosmia may follow an autosomal dominant pattern. Anosmia may very occasionally be an early sign of a degenerative brain disease such as Parkinson's disease and Alzheimer's disease.

Another specific cause of permanent loss could be from damage to olfactory receptor neurons because of use of certain types of nasal spray; i.e., those that cause vasoconstriction of the nasal microcirculation. To avoid such damage and the subsequent risk of loss of smell, vasoconstricting nasal sprays should be used only when absolutely necessary and then for only a short amount of time. Non-vasoconstricting sprays, such as those used to treat allergy-related congestion, are safe to use for prescribed periods of time. Anosmia can also be caused by nasal polyps. These polyps are found in people with allergies, histories of sinusitis, and family history. Individuals with cystic fibrosis often develop nasal polyps.

Amiodarone is a drug used in the treatment of arrhythmias of the heart. A clinical study demonstrated that the use of this drug induced anosmia in some patients. Although rare, there was a case in which a 66-year-old male was treated with amiodarone for ventricular tachycardia. After the use of the drug he began experiencing olfactory disturbance, however after decreasing the dosage of amiodarone, the severity of the anosmia decreased accordingly, suggesting a relationship between use of amiodarone to the development of anosmia.

COVID-19-related anosmia 
Chemosensory disturbances, including loss of smell or taste, are the predominant neurological symptom of COVID-19. As many as 80% of COVID-19 patients exhibit some change in chemesthesis, including smell. Loss of smell has also been found to be more predictive of COVID-19 than all other symptoms, including fever, cough or fatigue, based on a survey of 2 million participants in the UK and US. Google searches for "smell", "loss of smell", "anosmia", and other similar terms increased since the early months of the pandemic, and strongly correlated with increases in daily cases and deaths. Research into the mechanisms underlying these symptoms is currently ongoing.

Many countries list anosmia as an official COVID-19 symptom, and some have developed "smell tests" as potential screening tools.

In 2020, the Global Consortium for Chemosensory Research, a collaborative research organization of international smell and taste researchers, formed to investigate loss of smell and related chemosensory symptoms.

List of causes

Diagnosis
Doctors will begin with a detailed elicitation of history. Then the doctor will ask for any related injuries in relation to anosmia which could include upper respiratory infections or head injury. Psychophysical Assessment of order and taste identification can be used to identify anosmia. A nervous system examination is performed to see if the cranial nerves are damaged. The diagnosis, as well as the degree of impairment, can now be tested much more efficiently and effectively than ever before thanks to "smell testing kits" that have been made available as well as screening tests which use materials that most clinics would readily have. Occasionally, after accidents, there is a change in a patient's sense of smell. Particular smells that were present before are no longer present. On occasion, after head traumas, there are patients who have unilateral anosmia. The sense of smell should be tested individually in each nostril.

Many cases of congenital anosmia remain unreported and undiagnosed. Since the disorder is present from birth the individual may have little or no understanding of the sense of smell, hence is unaware of the deficit. It may also lead to reduction of appetite.

Treatment
Though anosmia caused by brain damage cannot be treated, anosmia caused by inflammatory changes in the mucosa may be treated with glucocorticoids. Reduction of inflammation through the use of oral glucocorticoids such as prednisone, followed by long term topical glucocorticoid nasal spray, would easily and safely treat the anosmia. A prednisone regimen is adjusted based on the degree of the thickness of mucosa, the discharge of oedema and the presence or absence of nasal polyps. However, the treatment is not permanent and may have to be repeated after a short while. Together with medication, pressure of the upper area of the nose must be mitigated through aeration and drainage.

Anosmia caused by a nasal polyp may be treated by steroidal treatment or removal of the polyp.

One experiment, where two people were given a single dose of 1,000 mg of turmeric, reported to find improvements in COVID-19-induced anosmia (and ageusia), however actual studies have yet to be done regarding this.

Although very early in development, gene therapy has restored a sense of smell in mice with congenital anosmia when caused by ciliopathy. In this case, a genetic condition had affected cilia in their bodies which normally enabled them to detect air-borne chemicals, and an adenovirus was used to implant a working version of the IFT88 gene into defective cells in the nose, which restored the cilia and allowed a sense of smell.

Epidemiology
In the United States 3% of people aged over 40 are affected by anosmia.

In 2012, smell was assessed in persons aged 40 years and older with rates of anosmia/severe hyposmia of 0.3% at age 40–49 rising to 14.1% at age 80+. Rates of hyposmia were much higher: 3.7% at age 40–49 and 25.9% at 80+.

See also 
 Phantosmia
 Parosmia
 Anosmia Awareness Day
 Zicam, a medicine that caused some users to permanently lose their sense of smell
 Ageusia, the loss of the sense of taste

References

Further reading 

 
 
 
 
 
  - Novel dealing with congenital anosmia.

External links 

Neurological disorders
Olfactory system
COVID-19 symptoms